Defense Devil (stylized as DEFENSE DEVIL)  is a Japanese manga series written by Youn In-Wan and illustrated by Yang Kyung-il. It was serialized by Shogakukan in Weekly Shōnen Sunday from April 2009 to June 2011. The story is about a banished demon named Kucabara who decides to become a Defense Devil in order to gather up dark matter which he needs to regain his devil powers again.

Story
Kucabara was recently banished and stripped of his powers. In order to regain his powers, he needs  which is found from human sinners. He decides to become a Defense Devil in order to get dark matter. A Defense Devil's duty is to prove the innocence of human sinner of his or her crime; once that is done, a Defense Devil shall be allowed to take the sinner's dark matter. Kucabara then must prove the sinner's innocence before a  takes the sinner to hell. One day, Kucabara's friend Funi arrives and tells him the demon world is in dishevel and Kucabara must return to save it. Kucabara, with the aid of his friends, Bichula the dragon demon and a female exorcist named Idamaria, infiltrates the demon world; they discover the source of the chaos to be Kucabara's younger brother, Legato, and set out to confront him. Eventually, they realize Legato was gathering energy to destroy the angels who reign control over Hell. After confronting Elimona and the angels, Kucabara is called by God and is taken to heaven. Kucabara returns to his friends and the series ends with him recruiting his friends to defend God who has been betrayed by his angels.

Production
Yang Kyung-Il and Youn In-Wan first created a one-shot of Defense Devil titled  for a 2008 issue of Sunday GX. After the release of the first tankōbon volume, the authors began a blog on the Shōnen Sunday website about their progress with the series. A contest was held in celebration of the second tankōbon volume where 100 winners are given autographed artwork by the authors.

Characters
 Kucabara is the protagonist of Defense Devil and the third son of the great demon king. After being stripped of his powers, Kucabara becomes a lawyer in order to make a living. His duty as hell's lawyer is to prove an unknown soul's innocence to prevent them from going to hell. Before he was stripped of his powers Kucabara was said to have the strongest dark matter in the demon world. Also Kucabara has openly expressed his feelings for Idamaria by proclaiming his love to her.
 Bichula is the formerly strongest warrior of the famous dragon family, which was massacred by the kingdom of the underworld. He was stripped of his powers and banished from the demon world along with Kucabara.
 Elimona is a fallen angel from heaven who runs a store in Event Horizon, a land between the real and demon worlds. She frequently cosplays and tries to seduce Bchuler and Kucabara, much to their chagrin. However, she is often turned to for help or advice by the protagonists. In chapter 85 she revealed to Idamaria that she is an angel and wanted to destroy the demon world by releasing the goddess Lilith.
 Idamaria is a nun who specializes in demon exorcism and is romantically interested in Kucabara. It is later revealed that Idamaria is able to produce dark matter from her body. In chapter 72 it is said that her name before entering the church was Catherine.
 Selma is a priest in charge of the institution where Idamaria lives. He is the one who trained Idamaria and Kucabara to cooperate with each other in order for them to open a portal to the demon world. A powerful exorcist, he is acquainted with Elimona and obtains information about the demon world through her. His name before dying was Kanto.
 A proud, apathetic, and analytic shinigami-ranked demon whose attacks are based on mathematical formulas. He hates underlying schemes and would even revolt against Legato for his ethics. During his stay in the orphanage, he grew fond of a young girl named Jupiter and seeks to free her parents from hell.
 Legato is the primary antagonist of the series and the fourth son of the great demon king, Kucabara's younger brother. After plotting Kucabara's banishment, he received all of Kucabara's power.
 The newest member of Kucabara and the others. She was betrayed so many times that she despised relationships and settled out to destroy them. Her original plan was to ruin Kucabara's and Bchuler's relationship and kill them, but she ends up joining their cause. She wields a rifle.
 A little girl taken in by the institution run by Father Seruma when her parents were killed in an accident. She was abducted by the many shinigami who were working for Legato in order to lure Kucabara into going to the demon world. She becomes attached to Sugal after he saves her.

Publication
Defense Devil, written by Youn In-Wan and illustrated by Yang Kyung-Il, was serialized in Shogakukan's Weekly Shōnen Sunday from April 8, 2009, to June 8, 2011. Shogakukan collected its chapters in ten tankōbon volumes, released from August 18, 2009, to September 16, 2011.

Volume list

Reception
Defense Devil has been reviewed in French by staff of Manga Sanctuary, and by Planetebd, and by Manga-News. It has also been reviewed in German by SplashComics.

References

External links
Defense Devil official website at Web Sunday 

2009 manga
Demons in anime and manga
Shogakukan manga
Shōnen manga